"Push the Button" is a song by English girl group the Sugababes, released as the lead single from their fourth studio album Taller in More Ways (2005). Composed by Dallas Austin and the Sugababes, it was inspired by an infatuation that group member Keisha Buchanan developed with another artist. Musically, "Push the Button" is an electropop and R&B song with various computer effects.

The song received positive reviews from critics, who praised its conception and production. Some critics named it one of the best pop singles of the 2000s. "Push the Button" became one of the group's most commercially successful releases. The single peaked at number one in Austria, Ireland, New Zealand, and the United Kingdom, and reached the top five across Europe and in Australia. It was nominated for Best British Single at the 2006 Brit Awards.

Matthew Rolston directed the song's music video, which was filmed in Shepherd's Bush, London. It features the Sugababes flirting with three men in a lift. The Sugababes performed the single at festivals and events such as Oxegen 2008 and the V Festival 2008. "Push the Button" appears on the soundtrack to It's a Boy Girl Thing (2006).

Development and concept

Development of "Push the Button" began while the Sugababes travelled to the United States to work on their fourth studio album, Taller in More Ways (2005). American producer and songwriter Dallas Austin collaborated with the group during the album's initial stages of development. He visited London to work with them, although the group later travelled to the US and stayed with him at his mansion in Atlanta, Georgia. Austin wrote five tracks for the album, including "Push the Button", which he composed in collaboration with the Sugababes. According to group member Heidi Range, the song was "the very last thing" completed for the album.

"Push the Button" was conceptualised after group member Keisha Buchanan developed an infatuation with another artist who was collaborating with Austin. Buchanan told Jess Cartner-Morley of The Guardian that she made advances towards the man, but he was unaware of her intentions: "I really liked this guy, so I'd be like, there's this good movie coming out, you know, dropping hints. And he'd be like, that movie sounds great, let me know what it's like if you go see it. I knew he liked me too but he just wasn't getting what I was trying to say." Austin advised Buchanan to tell the man to "push that button" or she would eventually move on.  In a video on her songwriting experiences posted onto her YouTube channel in July 2020, Buchanan said that Austin teased her relentlessly about her crush after an outing by rapping and playing the keyboard; she then returned his bantering and the song instantly developed from there. She also said that Austin encouraged her to imagine she was speaking directly to her crush for the spoken word middle-8 section, and she improvised her speech from there.

Mutya Buena, another member of the Sugababes, clarified Buchanan's encounter with the artist to Hot Press magazine's Jackie Hayden, saying: "We all knew there was something going on between them at the time, but we try to give each other space." She described "Push the Button" as a song "with meaning and real life references", and characterised it as having a "street vibe". Austin produced the song, which was recorded at DARP Studios in Atlanta & Home Recordings, London. "Push the Button" was mixed by Jeremy Wheatley at TwentyOne Studios, London, in collaboration with Richard Edgeler. Rick Shepphard engineered the song.

Composition and lyrics

"Push the Button" is an uptempo electropop and R&B song. AllMusic's  K. Ross Hoffman called it an "electropop club ditty", while Joe Muggs of The Daily Telegraph noted that Austin's production combines "raucous" electropop with "slick" American R&B. According to the digital sheet music published by Hal Leonard Corporation, "Push the Button" was composed in the key of A-flat major using common time, with a fast-paced tempo of 126 beats per minute. The song's instrumentation is composed of drums, keys, a guitar and a bass guitar.

The production consists of various computer beats and electronic effects. The song contains an ascending bridge incorporated into the chorus, which consists of the lines: "If you're ready for me boy / You'd better push the button and let me know / Before I get the wrong idea and go." Lyrically, the song is about a woman's sexual frustration of being unnoticed by a man.  Joe Macare of Stylus Magazine described Buena's delivery of the lyric "my sexy ass" as "carefree", and noted that the lyrics adapt an "idiosyncratic approach" to the English language. Musically, "Push the Button" received comparisons to the sound of pop group ABBA.

Release and reception
"Push the Button" was announced as the lead single from Taller in More Ways in August 2005. Island Records released it as a CD single and digital download on 26 September 2005 with an accompanying B-side titled "Favourite Song", composed by the Sugababes, Cameron McVey, and Jony Lipsey. An extended play was released, featuring a DJ Prom remix of the song, and the B-side "Like the Weather", which was written by the Sugababes, Cathy Dennis, and Guy Sigsworth. "Push the Button" is included on the Sugababes' greatest hits album, Overloaded: The Singles Collection.

"Push the Button" received positive reviews from many critics. Linda McGee from RTÉ.ie commended the song's beat and melody, and named it the album's best track. The song received a similar response from K. Ross Hoffman of AllMusic, who noted it as one of the album's highlights, and praised its simplicity and effectiveness. The Guardians Alexis Petridis considered the melody as "sweet and addictive as Smarties", while Kitty Empire of the same publication wrote that the track's "surface simplicity masks a hook that won't let go". Writing for Daily Record, reporter John Dingwall regarded the song as "enormously catchy and retro sounding".

A journalist from the Liverpool Daily Post characterised "Push the Button" as "another edgy stomper" and said that it capitalises on the Sugababes' "streetwise credentials and individual vocal strengths". Observer Music Monthly described the song's lyrics as "perfect pop" and recognised it as one of 2005's best singles. The song is a "ray of melodic sunshine" according to Rafael Behr of The Observer, who lauded its catchiness. Jerusalem Post critic Harry Rubenstein described "Push the Button" as an "infectious Abba-esque soundscape". Paul Taylor from the Manchester Evening News called it one the album's best moments and highlighted Austin's contribution. A writer for Virgin Media praised his production of the song, in addition to its chorus, but criticised the Sugababes' performance as "lacklustre".

Commercial performance
"Push the Button" debuted on the Irish Singles Chart on 29 September 2005 at number two. The song topped the chart for the next three weeks, and was the group's first number-one single in Ireland. "Push the Button" entered the UK Singles Chart on 2 October 2005 at number one, a position it held for three consecutive weeks. It became the Sugababes' fourth single to reach number one in the UK. During the song's third week on the chart, the Sugababes were simultaneously number one on the UK's singles, albums, and download chart. "Push the Button" has sold 471,000 copies in the UK and is the Sugababes' second highest-selling single there, behind "About You Now".

"Push the Button" entered the Austrian Singles Chart at number one, and remained in the position for five weeks. The song peaked at number two on the German Singles Chart, and was the third most-played British track on German radio in 2005. It was the country's 86th most successful single of the 2000s. The single peaked at number two in Belgium (Flanders), Hungary, Norway, and Romania, and reached number three in the Czech Republic, Denmark, and Switzerland. The song peaked at number three on the Dutch Top 40 chart for six consecutive weeks, and spent two weeks at number four on the Swedish Singles Chart.

"Push the Button" debuted at number 24 on the Australian Singles Chart in the issue dated 30 October 2005. After weeks of fluctuating on the chart, the song peaked at number three on 15 January 2006. It became the Sugababes' most successful single in Australia. The single was certified platinum by the Australian Recording Industry Association (ARIA), denoting shipments of 70,000 copies. "Push the Button" entered the New Zealand Singles Chart on 14 November 2005 at number five, and peaked at number one on 23 January 2006 for three consecutive weeks. It was the group's first number-one single on the chart, and was certified gold by the Recording Industry Association of New Zealand, indicating sales of 7,500 copies.

Music video
The music video for "Push the Button" was directed by American director Matthew Rolston, who collaborated with the Sugababes on the videos for their singles "Hole in the Head" and "In the Middle", and was produced by Lindsay Turnham for Exposure Films. It was filmed in Shepherd's Bush, London, in July 2005. The men who appear in the video are models and dancers, and were selected based on their dancing ability. Buena described the video as "really cheeky" and stated that it "turned out really great in the end". Some clips were removed from the final product because of their sexual content, although Buchanan admitted that she wanted it to be more suggestive.

The video features Range, Buchanan and Buena emerging from a lift onto separate floors of a tall building, the lift having been called by unsuspecting men. Range arrives on the floor of the first man, described by Buena as 'Mr Shy Guy', and the two begin flirting with each other. Buchanan opens the lift door to see, the second man, 'Mr Too Cool' and Buchanan is shown flirting and dancing with him. Buena emerges from the lift to find 'Mr Perfect', the third man. Buena takes his folded umbrella and throws it away, and soon begins flirting with him. 

Towards the end of the video, Range bends over 'Mr Shy Guy' in a seductive manner, Buchanan pushes 'Mr Too Cool' to the floor, and Buena gives 'Mr Perfect' a lap dance. The Sugababes are shown dancing in the lift throughout the video. Daily Mirror'''s Gavin Martin wrote that they "throw caution aside and present themselves as voracious maneaters" in the video. He compared Buchanan's dancing to that of American girl group Destiny's Child in the video for their single "Bootylicious". Madeline Crisp of the same publication described the Sugababes as having a "60s look". The video peaked at number one on the UK TV Airplay chart for two consecutive weeks. In Australia, the clip reached number three on Rage's top 50 video countdown.

Live performances

The Sugababes travelled to Turin, Italy, in February 2006 and performed "Push the Button" for Top of the Pops at the Winter Olympics. The song was included in the set list of the group's 2006 tour in support of Taller in More Ways. The single was performed on 3 October 2006 at the 100 Club on Oxford Street, London, as part of the album launch for Overloaded: The Singles Collection. It was the gig's closing performance, and, according to a critic from MTV UK, "got everyone bopping to its bonkers, techno beat". The group performed "Push the Button" at London's G-A-Y nightclub in November 2006, wearing PVC clothing and rubber gear. The single appeared in the set list of the group's 2008 Change Tour. They performed the song on 1 June 2008 at Princes Street Gardens, Edinburgh as part of the Vodafone Live Music tour; David Pollock of The Scotsman suggested that it was one of the show's standouts.

The Sugababes performed "Push the Button" on 27 June 2008 in Hyde Park, London as part of Nelson Mandela's 90th birthday concert. They performed the single in July 2008 at the Oxegen Festival. A journalist from NME magazine wrote that it drew "one of the biggest crowds" at the event. A rock version was performed at the 2008 V Festival in Essex, England. The group played the song on 28 August 2008 at the Bridlington Spa as part of a gig, and at the 2008 Q Awards at The Forum, London, beginning with the synthesizer intro from "Won't Get Fooled Again" by British band The Who. "Push the Button" was one of the singles they performed at St Osyth's entertainment centre, The Venue, on 7 March 2009. The group performed it on 10 July 2009 at the Riverside Ground in County Durham, England, as part of a set list. Buchanan performed the song on 19 July 2011 at the Jacques Townhouse, as part of a set list that included the group's debut single "Overload", in addition to her solo tracks. Range and her dancing partner Andrei Lipanov skated to "Push the Button" during their appearance on the seventh series of Dancing on Ice.

Recognition and popular culture
Andy Kellman of AllMusic described "Push the Button" as one of the most "clever and suggestive" pop singles of the 2000s, while Cameron Adams of the Herald Sun similarly highlighted it as one of the decade's best pop releases. In October 2008 Nick Levine of Digital Spy called the song one of the best pop singles of the 21st century. Buchanan named it among her favourites from the group's career, citing its representation of pop music "in a different light". "Push the Button" ranked 42nd on Stylus Magazine's list of 'Top 50 Singles of 2005', and 70th on The Daily Telegraphs list of '100 songs that defined the Noughties'. The song earned the Sugababes a BRIT Award nomination at the 2006 BRIT Awards for Best British Single, but lost to Coldplay's "Speed of Sound". It was one of the most played songs on British radio in 2005, and became the UK's 68th most popular song on radio of the 2000s.

"Push the Button" has been referenced several times in popular culture. The song serves as the opening track to the soundtrack of the 2006 film It's a Boy Girl Thing. It was featured in a commercial for Tassimo coffee machines, which led to an increase in the product's sales, as well as airings of the commercial across Europe and in the United States. English band Starsailor performed a live cover version of the song as the B-side to their 2006 single "This Time". It was also covered by English hip hop duo Dan le sac vs Scroobius Pip, who performed it at the 2008 Bestival. Lynsey Haire of eFestivals wrote that the performance "went down especially well with the audience". "Push the Button" was included in the playlist for the opening ceremony of the London 2012 Summer Olympics. Firefighters in Staffordshire, England, performed a cover version, although the lyrics were modified to encourage the public to regularly test the smoke alarms in their homes. The video was promoted through YouTube, and was viewed more than 44,000 times. Peter Dartford, the chief fire officer for Staffordshire Fire and Rescue Service said:

Track listings

UK CD1 & European CD single / digital download
"Push the Button"  – 3:38
"Favourite Song"  – 3:46

Digital EP & UK CD2 / European Maxi single
"Push the Button"  – 3:38
"Like the Weather"  – 3:45
"Push the Button" (DJ Prom Remix)  – 8:14
"Push the Button" (Video) 3:37

Digital Single

"Push the Button"(Acoustic Version)  – 3:19

Digital Single
"Push the Button"(Psycho Radio Remix)  – 8:03

Credits and personnel
Recording
Recorded at DARP Studios, Atlanta & Home Recordings, London

Personnel
Songwriting – Dallas Austin, Mutya Buena, Keisha Buchanan, Heidi Range
Production – Dallas Austin
Engineering – Rick Sheppard
Recording engineering (assistant) – Graham Marsh, Ian Rossiter, Owen Clark
Mixing – Jeremy Wheatley
Mixing (assistant) – Richard Edgeler
Drums – Dallas Austin
Keys – Dallas Austin
Guitar – Tony Reyes
Bass guitar – Tony Reyes

Credits adapted from the liner notes of Taller in More Ways'', Universal Island Records.

Charts

Weekly charts

Year-end charts

Decade-end charts

Certifications

See also
List of UK Singles Chart number ones of the 2000s
List of number-one hits of 2005 (Austria)
List of number-one singles from the 2000s (New Zealand)
List of number-one singles of 2005 (Ireland)

References

2005 songs
2005 singles
Electropop songs
European Hot 100 Singles number-one singles
Irish Singles Chart number-one singles
Island Records singles
Number-one singles in Austria
Number-one singles in New Zealand
Number-one singles in Scotland
Song recordings produced by Dallas Austin
Songs written by Dallas Austin
Songs written by Heidi Range
Songs written by Keisha Buchanan
Songs written by Mutya Buena
Sugababes songs
UK Singles Chart number-one singles